Huge is an American teen drama television series that aired on ABC Family. The series is based on the young adult novel series of the same name by Sasha Paley. The hour-long drama series revolves around eight teens sent to a summer weight loss camp called Camp Victory. Winnie Holzman (creator of My So-Called Life) and her daughter Savannah Dooley wrote the plot.

Casting began in January, with production beginning in April 2010. The series premiered on June 28, 2010, at 9 p.m. with 2.53 million viewers. On October 4, 2010, ABC Family announced that Huge was not getting an extra episode order, therefore canceling the show.

Cast and characters
 Nikki Blonsky as Willamena ("Will") Rader – sardonic and opinionated, she resents being sent to fat camp by her parents. She thinks that "fat camp" teaches campers to hate their bodies, and rather than hate her extra weight, she'd rather embrace it. She's regularly rude and sarcastic, but through her relationship with Becca and Ian, she shows more of a softer side. She has a crush on Ian and was angry after he read a page in her journal and composed a song based on a poem he saw in it. She is jealous of Ian's crush on Amber as she feels no one will love her because of her obesity. Will's parents own the fictional lifestyle health club chain, CORE.
 Hayley Hasselhoff as Amber – Although she is the least fat girl at fat camp, she is still determined to lose weight Although she is usually even-tempered and nice to others, she can have a mean streak (most often seen when she's interacting with Will). Her mother is co-dependent and immature, resulting in Amber taking on more of a maternal role in that relationship. She has paid for the camp with her own savings. Amber becomes friends with Chloe at camp and soon falls for George, a college-age counselor. In the 6th episode, Amber and George share their first kiss. In the seventh episode she and George start a secret relationship together, which he ends quickly.
 Raven Goodwin as Becca Huffstatter – a painfully shy bookworm who befriends Will. Their relationship helps Becca gain confidence in herself. She reads constantly and is interested in geek-like subjects such as LARPing and runes. She secretly read Will's journal and is aware of Will's crush on Ian. She used to be best friends with Chloe.
 Ari Stidham as Ian Schonfeld – an awkward musician who connects with Will over music. He has said how he hated all of his music until the song he wrote with Will's words. He's often sarcastic, but can also be very awkward (mostly when he's with Amber). During Parent Week, his parents tell him that they are filing for a divorce.
 Ashley Holliday as Chloe Delgado – Once close friends with the shy Becca, she seeks after popularity, and dropped Becca for the popular crowd. This is her second year at Camp Victory. She is dating Trent. She and Alistair are twins, although that fact is not common knowledge among the campers until Dr. Rand reveals it before parents day. The summer before the session shown in the series, she was found in a popular boy's sleeping bag during Movie Night, presumably after they'd had sex. No campers aside from Alistair know this, however.
 Harvey Guillén as Alistair Delgado – an oddball, often mocked and excluded by other campers, he lives in his own world. He frequently mentions his preferences for more "girly" things – during Spirit Quest, he chose the name Athena and he mentioned in episode eight that his sister got all of the toys he wanted, referencing a set of dolls. It was revealed in episode 2 that Alistair is Chloe's brother, a fact she wants to keep secret. In episode 6, Alistair reveals to Trent that not only are he and Chloe siblings, they're twins.
 Stefan Van Ray as Trent – a jock who lost his mother several years earlier. He's also one of the only people in the camp to know Chloe and Alistair are twins. He likes to jam with Ian, even though he can only barely play the drums, and he's dating Chloe. Though he seems like a typical jock, he sometimes goes outside of his image, such as when he bonded with Alistair.
 Jacob Wysocki as Dante Piznarski – Trent's mischievous buddy. His first name is not known until Dr. Rand reveals it during a discussion on the morning of Parents Day.
 Gina Torres as Dr. Dorothy Rand – the well-intentioned but stern camp director. Her father is Salty. She is grappling with food-related issues, and is a member of Overeaters Anonymous. She is often very awkward around other people, and she isn't very good at personal relationships.
 Zander Eckhouse as George – a handsome camp counselor that the girls swoon over. He is the assistant coach, and Shay's assistant. He shows signs of jealousy when Trent shows interest in Amber. In the 6th episode, Amber and George share their first kiss.
 Zoe Jarman as Poppy – the girls' ever-cheerful, fairy-like counselor. She is often very supportive and protective of both the girls she watches over and the rest of the campers as well. She is asexual. She was once overweight and attended Camp Victory herself.
 Paul Dooley as Joe "Salty" Sosniak – the Camp Victory chef and Dr. Rand's father. He has a poker face, so his emotions don't show well, and he can often be blunt. He has a tattoo with the name Joyce on his shoulder, and he gambled in the past. He walked out on Dr. Rand and her mother when Dr. Rand was 11 years old. His catchphrase is "No Seconds".
 Tia Texada as Shay – the trainer at Camp Victory. She appears to be a parody of Jillian Michaels, attempting to get through to the kids by screaming and harassing them. She has a daughter named Roxy.

Episodes

U.S. Nielsen ratings
The following is a table with the average estimated number of viewers per episode of the only season of Huge on ABC Family.

Home media
The complete series was released on DVD on February 22, 2011 via Shout! Factory.

References

External links
 

2010s American teen drama television series
2010 American television series debuts
2010 American television series endings
ABC Family original programming
Body image in popular culture
English-language television shows
Obesity in television
Television series about summer camps
Television series about teenagers
Television series by Alloy Entertainment
Television series by Disney–ABC Domestic Television
Television shows based on American novels
Television shows set in Los Angeles